Sébastien Locigno (born 2 September 1995) is a Belgian professional footballer who plays as a right back.

Career
He made his Jupiler Pro League debut for Gent on 26 December 2013 in the 21st week of the 2013–14 season against Mons. He replaced Yaya Soumahoro after 60 minutes in a 1–0 away defeat.

In April 2020, ahead of the 2020–21 season, Locigno signed with Francs Borains. His contract with the club was terminated by mutual consent in December 2021, making him a free agent.

Personal life
Locigno was born in Belgium to an Italian father and a Belgian mother.

References

External links

1995 births
Living people
Belgian footballers
Belgian expatriate footballers
Belgium youth international footballers
Belgian people of Italian descent
K.A.A. Gent players
K.V. Oostende players
Royal Excel Mouscron players
Go Ahead Eagles players
UR La Louvière Centre players
Belgian Pro League players
Eredivisie players
Belgian Third Division players
Association football defenders
Belgian expatriate sportspeople in the Netherlands
Expatriate footballers in the Netherlands
Francs Borains players